Kenneth Walker III (born October 20, 2000) is an American football running back for the Seattle Seahawks of the National Football League (NFL). He played college football at Wake Forest and Michigan State. He won the Walter Camp and Doak Walker Awards in 2021.

High school
Walker was born on October 20, 2000, in Arlington, Tennessee. He attended Arlington High School and played for their football team, where he rushed for 3,485 yards with 41 touchdowns. He committed to Wake Forest University to play college football.

College career
Walker  played at Wake Forest in 2019 and 2020. During those two years he rushed for 1,158 yards on 217 carries with 17 touchdowns. After the 2020 season, Walker transferred to Michigan State University. He became the starter his first year at Michigan State. In his debut with the Spartans, he rushed for 264 yards and four touchdowns.  His four touchdowns doubled the Michigan State 2020 season total, and were the first for a Spartan running back since  the 2019 season.  Walker III was awarded the Doak Walker and Walter Camp Player of the Year Award for the 2021 NCAA season. He earned Consensus All-American honors for the 2021 season. Following the season, he announced that he would forgo his senior year and declared for the 2022 NFL Draft.

College statistics

Professional career

Walker was drafted in the second round with the 41st overall pick in the 2022 NFL Draft. He made his NFL debut in Week 2 against the San Francisco 49ers. In Week 5, against the New Orleans Saints, he had a 69-yard rushing touchdown in the 32-39 loss.  He was named the starting running back for the Seattle Seahawks after Rashaad Penny was placed on injured reserve. In Week 7, against the Los Angeles Chargers, Walker rushed for 167 yards and two touchdowns in the 37–23 victory. On November 3, 2022, Walker was named the NFL's Offensive Rookie of the Month for October. In Week 9, he rushed for 109 yards and two touchdowns in a 31–21 victory over the Arizona Cardinals. In Week 12, he had another game with two rushing touchdowns in the 40–34 loss to the Las Vegas Raiders. He closed out the regular season with three consecutive games with over 100 rushing yards. He finished his rookie season with 228 carries for 1,050 rushing yards and nine rushing touchdowns to go along with 27 receptions for 165 receiving yards. He joined Curt Warner as the only players in franchise history to rush for at least 1,000 yards as a rookie. On January 14, 2023, during the 2022–23 NFL playoffs, Walker rushed the ball 15 times for 63 yards and a touchdown, during a 41–23 Wild Card Round loss to the San Francisco 49ers. He was named to the 2022 PFWA All-Rookie Team.

Regular season

References

External links
 
 
 Seattle Seahawks bio
Michigan State Spartans bio
Wake Forest Demon Deacons bio

2000 births
Living people
People from Shelby County, Tennessee
Players of American football from Tennessee
American football running backs
Wake Forest Demon Deacons football players
Michigan State Spartans football players
All-American college football players
Seattle Seahawks players